The Amazon Coat is an unnamed coat sold on the online store Amazon.com by the Chinese clothing brand Orolay, previously known for its home furnishings. It became a viral phenomenon from the period between December 2018 and the COVID-19 pandemic. Despite its "nondescript", utilitarian appearance and initial US$100 price, it was touted as having extremely high-quality down feather filling and sold at least 10,000 units, significantly increasing Orolay's profits and notoriety. It was noted by journalists as a prominent example of New York City street fashion at that time.

History 

The Amazon Coat was sold by Orolay on Amazon prior to 2016, but had received little popularity or notice. Jessica Reich, a teacher at the 92nd Street Y who found the coat on a travel blog in 2016 while planning a trip to Iceland, became a crucial influencer, spreading knowledge of it by word of mouth, though it is possible that a Korean blogger had worn it first. By fall 2017, it started being worn by "ultra-stylish" women on the Upper East Side and picked up by fashion journalists, who were intrigued why they were wearing such a low-priced coat. In early 2018, it received an article in The Strategist, and in late 2018, its popularity "took off" when The New York Times included it in an article about stylish Brooklyn moms. Lauren Posner, an Upper East Side resident, started an Instagram account chronicling sightings of the coat as a marketing experiment. It sold more than 10,000 units, making Orolay more profit in early 2019 than the entirety of 2017, and causing them to expect $30 to US$40 million in revenue for 2019.

The coat gained further mainstream popularity when Oprah put it on her list of favorite things of 2019.

Reception 
The coat, sold in separate men's and women's versions, was described as "fairly plain" and "not cool", with its initial color being olive green. Its paneling and zippers were noted as being influenced by luxury fashion house Balenciaga, with the coat's appeal lying in its "super different" appearance and low price despite its resemblance to far more expensive clothing. Its sudden prominence was compared to the Moncler and the "black puffy North Face" coat in the '90s.

Despite its origin as a legitimate viral trend, much of is popularity may have been inflated by fashion journalists due to profits from affiliate marketing. Despite having bolstered the reputation of its manufacturer and not harming its customers, it was noted as having caused the cost of the coat to rise to $140 from its initial price.

References 

2019 in fashion
American fashion
Individual garments
Internet memes introduced in 2018
Street fashion